Ilias Fyntanis (born 21 May 1962) is a Greek professional football manager.

He holds an UEFA Pro Coaching Licence.

References

External links
 http://www.onsports.gr/tag/2185/fyntanis-hlias onsports.gr (in Greek)
 http://www.thessaliatv.gr/news/49202/apekthse-kai-bohtho-o-hlias-fyntanhs/ thessaliatv.gr (in Greek)
 http://www.rodiaki.gr/article/348329/poios-einai-o-hlias-fyntanhs-poy-analambanei-to-timoni-toy-ialysoy rodiaki.gr (in Greek)
 http://www.sport24.gr/sport24radio/fyntanhs-kanenas-den-mporei-na-piasei-koroido-ton-kougia.4901643.html sport24.gr (in Greek)

1962 births
Living people
Footballers from Kalamata
Greek football managers
Super League Greece managers
Ilioupoli F.C. managers
Panachaiki F.C. managers
Vyzas F.C. managers
Paniliakos F.C. managers
Iraklis Psachna F.C. managers
GAS Ialysos 1948 F.C. managers
Athlitiki Enosi Larissa F.C. managers